The Abbey Barn in Preston Plucknett, Yeovil, Somerset, England was built around 1420 by John Stourton (died 1438), in conjunction with the Abbey Farm House. It has been designated as a Grade I listed building, and Scheduled Ancient Monument.

It is now used as a building contractors showroom and store.

See also
 List of Grade I listed buildings in South Somerset

References

Buildings and structures completed in 1420
Grade I listed buildings in South Somerset
Buildings and structures in Yeovil
Scheduled monuments in South Somerset
Barns in England
Tithe barns in Europe